Koyunbaba is a Turkish nickname with the epithet meaning "sheep father". It may refer to:

Koyunbaba, a 15th-century Turkish saint named Seyit Ali
 Koyunbaba Bridge, a historic arch bridge at Osmancık, Çorum in Turkey
 Koyunbaba, Kalecik,  a village in Kalecik district of Ankara Province, Turkey